Alphonse Bory (15 October 1838 – 8 April 1891) was a Swiss politician and President of the Swiss Council of States from 1886 to 1887.

External links 
 
 

1838 births
1891 deaths
Members of the Council of States (Switzerland)
Presidents of the Council of States (Switzerland)
Free Democratic Party of Switzerland politicians